Vijay Kumar (born 16 March 1975) is an Indian former cricketer. He played one first-class match for Hyderabad in 2000/01.

See also
 List of Hyderabad cricketers

References

External links
 

1975 births
Living people
Indian cricketers
Hyderabad cricketers
People from West Godavari district
Cricketers from Andhra Pradesh